Kigulu is one of the five traditional principalities of the kingdom of Busoga in Uganda. It is located in the Iganga District.

It was founded around 1737 and became a part of the British protectorate in Busoga in 1896. Its ruler is known as the Ngobi. From 1809 to 1899, part of its territory was independent as the chiefdom of Kigulu-Buzimba.

References

History of Uganda